Warawaralong is a small village stretched across the Bells Line of Road in the Blue Mountains. It's in the state of New South Wales, Australia in the City of Hawkesbury.

References

External links
Hawkesbury People and Places - Names Gazetteer: Warawaralong

Towns in New South Wales
City of Hawkesbury
Communities in the Blue Mountains (New South Wales)